American rockabilly musician, and author, Chris Giorgio aka Jackslacks adapted his stage name from the Sparkletones 1957 hit song "Black Slacks" and is originally from Valley Stream, Long Island, New York and resides in San Diego, California, United States. 

After a brief musical flirtation with both the accordion and guitar, Jackslacks started playing drums in high school, heavily influenced by swing era drummers Gene Krupa and Buddy Rich, 1950's rockers DJ Fontana and Jerry Allison, and British Invasion timekeepers Ringo Starr and Charlie Watts. Perhaps more than any of the above-mentioned, Jackslacks has tried to emulate Fontana, who explained his drumming style by saying (paraphrase), "I learned the value of simplicity (at the Hayride), that's why I always play what I feel. If that won't work, I just won't do it again. I think the simple approach comes from my hearing so much big band music. I mixed it with rockabilly."

After graduating from college, Jackslacks honed his chops as a founding member in both Forbidden Pigs and Hot Rod Lincoln, popular groups in the early San Diego roots-rock scene, which also included Beat Farmers, The Paladins, and Mojo Nixon. At about the same time, childhood elementary school chum, Tommy Byrnes joined neo rockabilly band Stray Cats on second guitar and backing vocals for a European and US tour concluding at the New Orleans World's Fair, giving Jackslacks the inside track to both the exploding local and increasingly popular national rockabilly revival scenes. Jackslacks CD "Rock and Roll Dinosaur" was produced by Stray Cats slap bassist Lee Rocker and includes Byrnes on guitar, before he went on to play with Joan Jett and the Blackhearts and Rock and Roll Hall of Fame inductee Billy Joel. A huge fan of Sam Phillips Sun Records, Jackslacks co-wrote the Sun inspired original song "Bank Account's Too Small" on the Hot Rod Lincoln CD "Blue Cafe" which won best local recording at the San Diego Music Awards and whose title track was written for the band by Topcat Brian Setzer.

Jackslacks has performed and recorded with many popular players of the genre, as well as opening shows for a variety of original and neo revival acts all across the United States, including heroes Carl Perkins (who infamously referred to rockabilly as "blues with a country beat"), Jerry Lee Lewis, and Chuck Berry, The Blasters, Robert Gordon, Fabulous Thunderbirds, X, Reverend Horton Heat, NRBQ, Junior Brown, Ronnie Dawson, Ray Campi, High Noon, Morrissey and others. The Perkins show also featured Detroiter Johnny Powers ("Long Blond Hair"), the first and only recording artist to ever be under contract to both Sun and Motown, while the Jerry Lee show, MC'd by famed gravelly voiced radio DJ Wolfman Jack, showcased a setlist stacked with Sun favorites. Little Richard co-headlined the Chuck Berry performance. Jackslacks sums up the experiences by saying, "Getting to meet, hang out and share the stage with three of my all time favorite artists has been the highlight of my musical journey so far!"

Recent solo work, released on indie label Shield of Love and Black Ink Management & Music Group LLC powered by Bungalo Records and distributed through Universal Music has received excellent press and gained substantial airplay in the US, Europe and Australia; the album "Inside Out" concluded a six week run at #1 on The Roots Music Report's Top Rockabilly Album Chart by finishing number four overall for the year ending 2021. Jackslacks is a member of the Blackcat Rockabilly Europe Hall of Fame.

Discography
 Forbidden Pigs Forbidden Pigs (1987)
 Hot Rod Lincoln Hot Rod Lincoln (1993)
 Nobody's Business Waycool Rock and Roll (1997)
 Johnny Mercury and the Hot Rockets Shake Hands and Shack Up (2000)
 Jackslacks Rock and Roll Dinosaur (2002)
 Jackslacks I'm Just the Drummer Live! (2004)
 Jackslacks The Kind of Girl (2007)
 Dead Engines Crash 'n Burn (2010)
 Jackslacks Lucky Man (2012)
 Jackslacks Farm Jazz (2013)
 Jackslacks Other Side (2014)
 Jackslacks Invisible (2015)
 Jackslacks Earthling Sessions (2018)
 Jackslacks When Pigs Fly (2020)
 Jackslacks Inside Out (2021)
 Jackslacks The Unity Song (2022)

References

American rockabilly musicians 
Musicians from San Diego
People from Long Island
American drummers
Year of birth missing (living people)
Living people